Mindhunter is an American psychological crime thriller television series created by Joe Penhall, based on the 1995 true-crime book Mindhunter: Inside the FBI's Elite Serial Crime Unit written by John E. Douglas and Mark Olshaker. The executive producers include Penhall, Charlize Theron, and David Fincher, the latter of whom has served as the series' most frequent director and de facto showrunner, overseeing many of the scriptwriting and production processes. The series stars Jonathan Groff, Holt McCallany, and Anna Torv, and it follows the founding of the Behavioral Science Unit in the Federal Bureau of Investigation (FBI) in the late 1970s and the beginning of criminal profiling.

The first season of 10 episodes debuted worldwide on Netflix on October 13, 2017. The second season was released by Netflix on August 16, 2019. In January 2020, Netflix announced that the potential for a third season was on indefinite hold as Fincher wanted to pursue other projects, but may "revisit [the series] in the future". In February 2023, Fincher confirmed that the series was officially over.

Plot
Mindhunter revolves around FBI agents Holden Ford (Jonathan Groff) and Bill Tench (Holt McCallany), along with psychologist Wendy Carr (Anna Torv), who operate the FBI's Behavioral Science Unit within the Training Division at the FBI Academy in Quantico, Virginia. Together, they launch a research project to interview imprisoned serial killers to understand their psychology with the hope of applying this knowledge to solve ongoing cases.

The first season takes place from 1977 to 1980, in the early days of criminal psychology and criminal profiling at the FBI. Cameron Britton has a recurring role in this season as notorious serial killer Edmund Kemper, who is the first to assist Ford and Tench in understanding how a serial killer's mind works. Other notable serial killers featured in the first season include Montie Rissell played by Sam Strike, Jerry Brudos played by Happy Anderson, Richard Speck played by Jack Erdie, and Dennis Rader also known as BTK, played by Sonny Valicenti.

The second season takes place in 1980 and 1981, with Ford and Tench investigating the Atlanta murders of 1979 to 1981, which included at least 28 deaths, mostly children. This is based on the real case of Wayne Williams, who was charged and convicted for the murder of two adult men but was never tried for the killing of the children and adolescents, causing mass outrage and questions over Williams's guilt as the children's cases went cold. The second season also features other infamous murderers, such as David Berkowitz, also known as Son of Sam, played by Oliver Cooper, William Pierce Jr. played by Michael Filipowich, Elmer Wayne Henley Jr. played by Robert Aramayo, and Charles Manson, played by Damon Herriman.

Cast and characters

Main

 Jonathan Groff as Holden Ford, a special agent in the FBI's Behavioral Science Unit (BSU)
 Holt McCallany as Bill Tench, a special agent in the FBI's BSU
 Anna Torv as Wendy Carr, a psychology professor working towards tenure at Boston University who joins the BSU. She is a closeted lesbian.
 Hannah Gross as Debbie Mitford (season 1), Ford's girlfriend and a graduate student in sociology at the University of Virginia
 Cotter Smith as Robert Shepard (season 1; guest season 2), the assistant director at the FBI Academy overseeing the BSU 
 Stacey Roca as Nancy Tench (season 2; recurring season 1), Bill's wife
 Joe Tuttle as Gregg Smith (season 2; recurring season 1), a special agent newly assigned to the BSU
 Michael Cerveris as Ted Gunn (season 2), Shepard's successor as overseer of the BSU
 Lauren Glazier as Kay Manz (season 2), a bartender and Carr's love interest
 Albert Jones as Jim Barney (season 2; guest season 1), an Atlanta FBI agent
 Sierra McClain as Tanya Clifton (season 2), a hotel worker who brings Holden's attention to the Atlanta child murders
 June Carryl as Camille Bell (season 2), a grieving mother of Yusef Bell, one of the Atlanta murder victims and the organizer of the Committee to Stop Children's Murders

Recurring
 Cameron Britton as Ed Kemper, a serial killer interviewed by Ford and Tench
 Alex Morf as Mark Ocasek, a police officer from Altoona, Pennsylvania
 Joseph Cross as Benjamin Barnwright, a murder suspect in Altoona
 Marc Kudisch as Roger Wade, a Fredericksburg elementary-school principal
 Michael Park as Peter Dean, an Office of Professional Responsibility (OPR) investigator
 George R. Sheffey as John Boylen, an OPR investigator
 Duke Lafoon as Gordon Chambers, an Adairsville detective
 Peter Murnik as Roy Carver, a Sacramento detective
 Happy Anderson as Jerry Brudos, a serial killer interviewed by Ford and Tench
 Sonny Valicenti as ADT serviceman / Dennis Rader (BTK)
 Zachary Scott Ross as Brian Tench (season 2), Bill and Nancy's adopted son
 Nate Corddry as Art Spencer
 Regi Davis as Maynard Jackson (season 2), mayor of Atlanta
 Gareth Williams as Redding (season 2), the chief of Atlanta police
 Drew Seltzer as Dale Harmon (season 2), Bill and Nancy's neighbor
 Dohn Norwood as Lee Brown (season 2), the Atlanta police commissioner
 Brent Sexton as Garland Periwinkle (season 2)
 Christopher Livingston as Wayne Williams (season 2)

Guests
 Lena Olin as Annaliese Stilman (season 1), Carr's former lover and head of the psychology department at Boston University
 Sam Strike as Montie Rissell (season 1), a serial killer interviewed by Ford and Tench
 Jack Erdie as Richard Speck (season 1), a mass murderer interviewed by Ford and Tench
 Oliver Cooper as David Berkowitz (season 2)
 Robert Aramayo as Elmer Wayne Henley Jr. (season 2)
 Michael Filipowich as William "Junior" Pierce (season 2)
 Corey Allen as William Henry Hance (season 2)
 Damon Herriman as Charles Manson (season 2); Herriman previously portrayed the character in the 2019 film Once Upon a Time in Hollywood.
 Christopher Backus as Tex Watson (season 2)
 Morgan Kelly as Paul Bateson (season 2)

Development and production
The development of Mindhunter began in 2009 when Charlize Theron gave a nonfiction crime book titled Mindhunter: Inside the FBI's Elite Serial Crime Unit to David Fincher. In January 2010 the Mindhunter project was set up at Fox 21, which had optioned the book, along with premium cable channel HBO. Scott Buck was tapped to write the pilot. Fincher, who was mostly known as a director and producer in films, felt at that time that television was "completely foreign" until he worked on the political drama House of Cards, for which he co-produced and directed the first two episodes. When Fincher finally felt comfortable with television as a medium after doing House of Cards, Theron suggested playwright and screenwriter Joe Penhall as the project's writer, replacing Buck. In December 2015, Mindhunter was moved to streaming service Netflix, with Fox 21 dropping out of the project.

In February 2016, Netflix announced that the production of Mindhunter would be based in Pittsburgh, Pennsylvania. Filming began in May 2016, and open casting calls were held on April 16 and June 25, 2016. Episode 9 of season 1 was filmed in Moundsville, West Virginia at the West Virginia State Penitentiary. The series was renewed for a second season before its premiere on Netflix.

The character of Holden Ford is loosely based on FBI agent John E. Douglas, on whose book, Mindhunter: Inside the FBI's Elite Serial Crime Unit, the show is based. The character of Bill Tench is based on pioneering FBI agent Robert K. Ressler. Wendy Carr is a fictional character based on psychiatric forensic nurse researcher Ann Wolbert Burgess, a prominent Boston College nursing professor who collaborated with the FBI agents in the Behavioral Science Unit and procured grants to conduct research on serial murderers, serial rapists, and child molesters. Her work is based on treating survivors of sexual trauma and abuse, and studying the thought process of violent offenders. The serial killer characters were modeled on the actual convicted criminals and their prison scene dialogues were taken from real interviews. Although not explicitly stated, it is implied that the ADT serviceman seen in several short vignettes throughout the first season is Dennis Rader, the BTK Killer. This is clarified in the second season.

The musical score was written by Jason Hill.

The second season was originally reported to consist of eight episodes; however, the season ultimately contained nine episodes. Shooting took place between April and December 2018. Directors for the second season were Fincher, Andrew Dominik, and Carl Franklin.

In November 2019, a potential third season was reported to have been put on indefinite hold until Fincher finished working on his next film, Mank. Fincher plans to make five seasons. In January 2020, Netflix announced that the cast had been released from their contracts and that the series was on indefinite hold, as Fincher was busy with other projects. A Netflix spokesperson stated, "He may revisit Mindhunter again in the future, but in the meantime felt it wasn't fair to the actors to hold them from seeking other work while he was exploring new work of his own." In October 2020, Fincher confirmed the series was done for now, and a Netflix spokesperson said that a third season may be possible "maybe in five years". The next month, some of the reasons to suspend the series were fleshed out – cost (Fincher stated, "It had a very passionate audience, but we never got the numbers that justified the cost."), production (the second season showrunner was fired and eight of the scripts were rewritten), management (co-producer Peter Mavromates said of Fincher, "Even when he wasn't directing an episode, he was overseeing it."), and exhaustion (Fincher said, "I certainly needed some time away"). In February 2023, Fincher confirmed that the series was officially over.

Episodes

Season 1 (2017)

Season 2 (2019)

Reception

Critical response
The first season received positive reviews from critics. On Metacritic, the season has a score of 79 out of 100 based on 25 critics, indicating "generally favorable reviews". On Rotten Tomatoes, it has an approval rating of 96% with an average score of 8 out of 10, based on 102 reviews. The site's critics consensus reads: "Mindhunter distinguishes itself in a crowded genre with ambitiously cinematic visuals and a meticulous attention to character development." The first season of Mindhunter was named among the best TV shows of 2017; it was ranked No. 10 on Metacritic's year-end list of the best TV shows of 2017 compiled from rankings by various critics and publications.

The second season was also acclaimed. On Metacritic, the season has an average score of 85 out of 100, based on 12 critics, indicating "universal acclaim". On Rotten Tomatoes, the second season holds an approval rating of 99% based on 70 reviews, with an average rating of 8.3 out of 10. The site's critical consensus reads: "Mindhunter expands its narrative horizons without losing sight of the details that made its first season so rich, crafting a chilling second season that is as unsettling as it is utterly absorbing."

Accolades

References

External links

 
 

2010s American LGBT-related drama television series
2010s American crime drama television series
2017 American television series debuts
2019 American television series endings
Crime thriller television series
Cultural depictions of Charles Manson
Cultural depictions of David Berkowitz
Television series about the Federal Bureau of Investigation
Lesbian-related television shows
English-language Netflix original programming
Serial drama television series
Television shows based on non-fiction books
Television series about serial killers
Television series set in 1977
Television shows set in Atlanta
Television shows set in Boston
Television shows set in Illinois
Television shows set in Iowa
Television shows set in Kansas
Television shows set in Oregon
Television shows set in Pennsylvania
Television shows set in Sacramento, California
Television shows set in Virginia
Television shows set in Washington, D.C.
Television shows filmed in Pennsylvania
Television shows filmed in Pittsburgh